The Olympus PEN E-PM1 is an entry-level mirrorless interchangeable-lens camera from Japanese manufacturer Olympus with a Micro Four Thirds lens mount and sensor.  It includes a 12.3 megapixel sensor, 3-inch 460,000 pixel LCD screen, and sensor-based image stabilization, but no viewfinder or internal flash, although an external flash can be fitted.

History
The E-PM1 was announced on June 30, 2011 together with two other Olympus Micro Four Thirds cameras, EP3 and E-PL3.

Reviews
Reviewers generally praised the image quality and wide range of customization it offers, although there were some criticisms of its performance. The small size also divided reviewers, with some praising its compactness and others criticising it as difficult to handle and noting that the lack of external controls making it hard to quickly change settings.

DP Review rated it 71% and a silver award, praising its image quality, small size, and wide range of customisable features. 

What Digital Camera called it "an easy to use camera" while criticising the auto white balance accuracy, weak performance in low light, and lack of physical grip on the camera body.

Expert Reviews gave it 4/5, praising its flexibility and good value while calling it "far from perfect". 

PC Advisor noted a compromise between the small size and lack of physical controls, making it harder to quickly change between modes and settings, but found it was a good upgrade from a compact digital camera.

References

PEN E-PM1
Cameras introduced in 2011